‘Alā’ al-Dīn Abu al-Ḥasan ‘Alī ibn ‘Ajlān ibn Rumaythah ibn Abī Numayy al-Ḥasanī was an Emir of Mecca.

He was killed on Wednesday, 7 Shawwal 797 AH (28 July 1395).

He is possibly the same person as Sharif Ali of Brunei.

Notes

References

1395 deaths